The 2021 Texas Longhorns softball team represents the University of Texas at Austin during the 2021 NCAA Division I softball season. 
The Longhorns play their home games at Red and Charline McCombs Field as a member of the Big 12 Conference. 
They are led by head coach Mike White, in his 3rd season at Texas.

Personnel

Roster

Schedule and results

{| class="toccolours" width=95% style="margin:1.5em auto; text-align:center;"
|-
! colspan=2 style=""|2021 Texas Longhorns Softball Game Log
|-
! colspan=2 style=""|Regular season (38-9)
|- valign="top" 
|
{| class="wikitable collapsible collapsed" style="margin:auto; font-size:95%; width:100%"
! colspan=11 style="padding-left:4em;"|February (8-0)
|-
! Date
! Opponent
! Rank
! Site/Stadium
! Score
! Win
! Loss
! Save
! Attendance
! Overall Record
! Big 12 Record
|-
! colspan=12 style= "" | Scrap Yard Blizzard Challenge
|-
|-bgcolor= bbffbb
| Feb 21 ||  || #7 || Scrap Yard Complex •  Conroe, TX|| 8-0 (5) || O’Leary (1-0) || McDonald (1-1) || || 476 || 1-0 || –
|-bgcolor= bbffbb
| Feb 21 ||  || #7 || Scrap Yard Complex •  Conroe, TX|| 5-1 || Jacobsen (1-0) || Trautwein (2-1) || || 597 || 2-0 || –
|-
! colspan=12 style= "" | 
|-
|-bgcolor= bbffbb
| Feb 24 || Texas State || #7 || Red and Charline McCombs Field• Austin, TX|| 1-0 (8) || Jacobsen (2-0) || Mullins (1-1) || || 282 || 3-0 || –
|-
! colspan=12 style= "" | Lone Star State Invitational
|-bgcolor= bbffbb
| Feb 26 || Sam Houston State || #7 || Red and Charline McCombs Field• Austin, TX|| 9-3 || White (1-0) || Bachmeyer (0-2) || Day (1) || 0 || 4-0 || –
|-bgcolor= bbffbb
| Feb 26 || Lamar* || #7 || Red and Charline McCombs Field• Austin, TX|| 10-0 (5)|| Adams (1-0) || Reyna (0-5) || || 0 || 5-0 || –
|-bgcolor= bbffbb
| Feb 27 || #25 * || #7 || Red and Charline McCombs Field• Austin, TX|| 8-7 || O’Leary (2-0) || Loza (1-2) || Jacobsen (1) || 0 || 6-0 || –
|-bgcolor= bbffbb
| Feb 28 || UConn* || #7 || Red and Charline McCombs Field• Austin, TX|| 16-2 (5) || White (2-0) || Kinney (3-3) || || 0 || 7-0 || –
|-bgcolor= bbffbb
| Feb 28 ||  Ole Miss* || #7 || Red and Charline McCombs Field• Austin, TX|| 5-2 || Jacobsen (3-0)' || Diederich (3-5) || || 0 || 8-0 || –
|-
! colspan=12 style= "" | 
|-
|}

|-
! colspan=2 style=""|Postseason (5-5)
|- valign="top" 
|

|- 
|
|}

Coaches

Player Stats

Batting Note: No. = Number; G = Games played; AB = At bats; H = Hits; Avg. = Batting average; HR = Home runs; RBI = Runs batted inNote: Gold Highlight = Team Leader(s)Note: Leaders must meet the minimum requirement of 2 PA/G and 75% of games played''

Pitching

Rankings

References

Texas Longhorns
Texas Longhorns softball seasons
Texas Longhorns softball
Texas